Fito Blanko (born Roberto E. Testa) is a Panamanian-Canadian tropical urban singer and songwriter.

Biography
Fito Blanko created his own sound by combining his Panamanian dancehall roots with a North American delivery. Fito Blanko is officially a Mississauga walk of fame inductee, class of 2017. He was inducted alongside Canadian music Icons; Liberty Silver, Randy Lennox and Alex Pagman.

Fito has history that spans back to the early 2000s as a teenagers jumping in the Latin pop/urban market. Songs with Drake (2009) showcases some of the history behind Canada's most prolific Latin pop artist. Fans and industry professionals agree Fito Blanko is one of the hottest talents to enter the Latin crossover market. Fito Emigrated from Panama to Canada as a youngster, and he began writing lyrics in English and Spanish at the age of 14.

He expanded into the American Market in 2011 with the independent release of  "VIP" featuring Fuego, which charted on three U.S Latin Billboard charts: Latin Rhythm, Tropical Latin, Latin Pop. From New York to L.A to Miami, Fito quickly developed a reputation for lighting up parties with his electrifying performances and charm.

The year 2012 kicked off with Canada's largest daily newspaper, The Toronto Star, giving Fito front-page coverage in its People To Watch 2012 feature. His Follow up single " Pegaito Suavecito' topped the radio charts in South Florida for almost a month during the summer 2012 further branding his unique style in the U.S. The re-release of 'Pegaito Suavecito" featuring the tropical music legend and multi Grammy Award Winning Icon 'Elvis Crespo' went on to dominate the charts and became Blanko's first number #1 Latin Billboard chart topper in November 2012.

In 2013 Fito Shared the stage with 'Elvis Crespo' performing the #1 Tropical Billboard hit 'Pegaito Suavecito' during  Premios Lo Nuestro 25th Anniversary wards ceremony. During the week of the 2013 Billboard awards, Fito Blanko had 4 songs charting in the top 40 simultaneously, and became the 1st Canadian Latino Artist to achieve these chart positions. 'Mi Princesa', 'Esta Fiesta Remix', 'Pegaito Suavecito', 'Si Te Agarro' all appeared in various Billboard Charts at the same time. In July of the same year, Fito was nominated for the 'Cancion del verano' (song of the summer) category at Premios Juventud where he performed live with DJ Chino and Papayo their hit single 'Si Te Agarro'. Adding to the list of nominations, Fito & Elvis Crespo were nominated for their 'HIT' in the 'Best Party Song' ( Cancion Comienza Fiestas) at the Premios Tu Mundo in August 2013 making Fito a leading voice in Tropical Music. Blanko was nominated for 'Best Urban Performance' at the 14th annual edition of the Latin Grammy awards and was awarded platinum status for 'Pegaito Suavecito' by the U.S RIAA. Fito was also recognized with a BMI Award of Excellence in 2014 from the most airplay in the U.S & Puerto Rico.

In 2015 Blanko was featured on the original motion picture soundtrack for the Furious 7 ( Previously known as Fast & Furious). The Grammy- Nominated artist's "Meneo" is heard during the movie and appears courtesy of Mr305Inc on the 16-track Soundtrack LP by Atlantic Records. The album went #1 on the Billboard 200 and the movie also went on top the box office charts setting a world record for the fastest movie to reach 1 billion dollars in sales. Blanko was named Cultural Ambassador/Spokes person of the Toronto 2015 Pan Am games. The Pan Am games provided the perfect platform for the young artist to step up as a community leader and give back. His Pan Am games inspired theme song 'Come Alive' was featured during the live broadcast of the opening/ closing ceremonies which also included performances by Pitbull and Kanye West. The Grammy nominated artist was recognized with the prestigious #1 Song Award by the 'Society Of Composers Authors Music Publishers Canada' (SOCAN) that same summer and later inducted in Mississaugas 'CANADIAN MUSIC WALK OF FAME'  (Class of 2017).

Fito Participated in the official Swiss FIFA RUSSIA 2018 Anthem 'OLE OLE' with DJ Antoine. The song was heard in all tournament stadiums and broadcast worldwide during all Swiss games garnering millions of streams online. Blanko kicked off 2019 with two Top10 Billboard productions. 'La Gringa' with 'Bright Lights' peaked #6 in the U.S Billboard dance charts and cracked the Billboard Hot Electronic Top20 charts becoming Blankos first entry in the U.S American charts. Fitos second entry in the charts that year came as the co producer/songwriter of "Ella Me Beso" by Elvis Crespo. The song went on to crack the Top10 peaking at #4 in the Tropical Billboard Charts. The Latin stars international appeal and sound was sought after by the Czech artist and Eurovision superstar Mikolas Josef the same year. They collaborated in the European Hit 'Accapella' Produced by Canadian music veteran Jenson Vaughn. The song took the #1 iTunes spot in Czech Republic, Poland and Germany and has over 25 YouTube views to date. 2020 saw the resurgence of 'Meneo' regaining popularity via TikTok & Instagram Music. The song accumulated over 500,000 streams in April 2020 alone and peaked #3 In the Japanese iTunes/Shazam charts.

Blankos Production/Remixing credits include: Pitbull,Gente De Zona, Rick Ross, J Balvin, Enrique Iglessias, Shakira, Fat Joe, Chris Brown, Sergio George, Beenie Man and Juan Magan to name a few. Fito's contribution and impact to Canadian Latin music is one of a kind

www.fitoblanko.vip

Awards and nominations

Discography

Albums

Singles

Featured artist

References

 www.fitoblanko.vip  - biography
 14 Latin Grammy - Best Urban song "Pegaito Suavecito" Elvis Crespo - Fito Blanko
 14th Annual Latin Grammy Award 
Furious 7 "Meneo" soundtrack 
Furious 7 Movie - scene with song "Meneo"
Premios Juventud 2013
2013 Premio los Nuestro
2013 Premios Tu Mundo
Acapella Mikolas Josef ft. Fito Blanko
Spotify Fito Blanko 
Billboard Top 10 2019 Elvis Crespo

External links
 Fito Blanko on MySpace

Musicians from Mississauga
Panamanian emigrants to Canada
21st-century Panamanian male singers
21st-century Panamanian singers
Panamanian reggaeton musicians
People from Panama City
People from Colón Province
Year of birth missing (living people)
Living people
Spanish-language singers of Canada
21st-century Canadian male singers